Kevin John Conway (May 29, 1942 – February 5, 2020) was an American actor and film director.

Early life
Conway was born in New York City, to Helen Margaret (née Sanders), a sales representative, and James John Conway, a mechanic. Conway completed his acting training at HB Studio in New York City.

Career

Theatre
Conway's off-Broadway credits include One Flew Over the Cuckoo's Nest, One for the Road, The Elephant Man, Other People's Money, and When You Comin' Back, Red Ryder?, for which he received the 1974 Drama Desk Award.

On Broadway, Conway appeared in Indians, Moonchildren, and in revivals of The Plough and the Stars, Of Mice and Men (as George Milton, opposite James Earl Jones as Lennie Small), and Dinner at Eight. In 1980, he was nominated for the Drama Desk Award for Outstanding Director of a Play (Mecca).

Film
In his first major screen role, Conway portrayed Roland Weary in the 1972 film Slaughterhouse-Five, based on the Kurt Vonnegut novel.

Among other film roles, Conway played multiple characters in the 1981 horror film The Funhouse; Crum Petree, the irascible mailman in the 1988 film Funny Farm, Frank Papale in the fact-based 2006 Disney football drama Invincible and General Curtis LeMay in the 2000 historical drama  Thirteen Days. He played the fictional Buster Kilrain in Ron Maxwell's Civil War Duology: Gods and Generals and Gettysburg.

In 1987, Conway directed the independent film The Sun and the Moon.

Television
From 1995 to 2002, Conway was the Control Voice for the revived series of The Outer Limits. He made a guest appearance on Star Trek: The Next Generation as the clone of the legendary Klingon figure Kahless. He guest starred on The Good Wife episodes "Threesome", "Boom",  and "Wrongful Termination" as Jonas Stern, a founding partner of the titular character's law firm. He portrayed Seamus O'Reily, the abusive father of Ryan and Cyril O'Reily in the HBO prison drama Oz. He made an appearance as the father of titular brothers Michael and Tommy Caffee as Neal Caffee on the Showtime drama, “Brotherhood.”

Conway was a guest star on JAG in the episode "King of Fleas" portraying Roscoe Martin, a paraplegic Vietnam vet who confessed to a murder. In “The Martin Baker fan club” he returns as Roscoe Martin, now a mental patient, and faces a charge of second-degree murder.  He has also guest starred on three Law & Order series, the original series, two guest appearances on Law & Order: Criminal Intent, and one on Law & Order: Special Victims Unit. He also guest starred in the second season of In the Heat of the Night.  He also played the father of Jenny (played by Olivia Wilde) in NBC's The Black Donnellys in 2007.

Death
Conway died in Manhattan on February 5, 2020, of a heart attack.

Filmography

Film

Television

Notes

References

External links
 
 

1942 births
2020 deaths
Place of death missing
Male actors from New York City
American male film actors
American film directors
American male television actors
American male voice actors
American people of Irish descent
English-language film directors
20th-century American male actors
21st-century American male actors